Lotus was a house brand of certain guitars made in various Asian factories from the late 1970s until the late 1990s. Lotus guitars were usually copies of better-known, up-market brand-name guitars, such as the Gibson Les Paul and the Fender Stratocaster. The quality of the instruments was very good for the price (usually around US$400–$900).

History
Lotus is a brand name put on the headstocks of a line of good-quality electric guitars made by at least one Japanese [factory]. [Confirming information is difficult or impossible to find. However, based  upon the strong similarities between certain Lotus models and other guitars bearing the Washburn brand, the consensus in the guitar community is that both brands were built at least for a time by Yamaki.]
Construction of Lotus-branded guitars started with the elite league of Japanese craftsmen and initially made excellent Morris-branded guitars but trying to keep up with heavyweight makers such as Matsumoku [maker of Aria Pro II] and Fuji-Gen Gakki [maker of Yamaha], or Hoshino [maker of Ibanez] was difficult.  Mismanagement and, especially, the inability to market their initial superb-quality guitars soon had Lotus' owners scrambling for cheaper labor, ending in India with poor quality and eventually no takers for their product, as Chinese and Indonesian guitar producers stepped up with instruments of comparable quality at similar prices.
For a general description of the popular music market that gave rise to the host of brand names borne by good-quality Japanese music gear, see the Wikipedia article on Memphis Guitars.

Versions
The most common and good quality Lotus guitars were usually manufactured by Samick and others in Korea and India. The top-of-the-line early 1980s models were made by both in Korea by Cort Guitars (early neck-though models) and in Japan by Morris / Moridaira (neck-through models, set-neck Washburn Eagle copies, and decent Gibson Les Paul copies).

Like the Matsumoku guitars of that era, both the early Korean Cort and Japanese Morris-made Lotus guitars are of high quality.

Lotus guitars are no longer in production. While the low-end guitars have rightfully only experienced a minimal gain in value, the high-end models usually range from $100–$300 and are becoming quite collectible.

Chauntelle DuPree of the band Eisley used a Lotus Stratocaster copy for many years on tour and to record. While the quality of this guitar would not typically be considered to be on a professional level, it did provide an inexpensive platform for experimentation and upgrade (with non-Lotus parts), which resulted in a unique sounding instrument.

The Moridaira-made Lotus guitars are the rarest and hardest to find as Lotus/Morris made them at most for only 2–3 years.  These guitars all are solid-bodied and were made in the same factory as Tokai. There are only 3 models that are known to have come from Lotus/Morris:

 The Lotus L670B (a direct copy of the 1980-1982/3 Fender "Bullet"—MIA and MIJ, but not MIK) other than having switches instead of buttons, a different headstock shape, a solid body and the same pickups. There were no letters on the headstock.
 The Lotus Vantage copy (Washburn Eagle, Aria Pro II Cardinal series, or Ibanez Artist) double cutaway (batwing) guitar with a solid body, 3 per side tuners on headstock, rosewood fingerboard with brass inlays, brass nut and neck-through construction (though there may have been a bolt-on model). This was usually finished in emerald green, polished mahogany or stained blue/white breadboard style and occasionally gloss white with 2 exposed humbucker pickups.
 A more conventional Gibson Les Paul copy, usually only seen in gloss black or tobacco burst. These were neck through, and bolt on neck, with hardware similar to their double-cutaway Vantage copy.

These three models are easily on par with the Matsumoku-made Westbury and the high-end neck-through Vantage guitars.

External links
More Info in the Cort Dragon Inlay Guitars

Guitars